Rank comparison chart of all navies of the European Union member states.
Some EU member states do not have naval forces, either because they are landlocked Austria, the Czech Republic, Hungary, Luxembourg and Slovakia.

The Cyprus Navy is the naval branch of the Cypriot National Guard.
NATO has a scheme for comparative ranks for member countries, non-NATO countries equivalence is determined against this system.

Enlisted (OR 1–9)

Notes

References 

 STANAG 2116 NATO chart

See also 
Comparative navy officer ranks of the European Union
Military rank
Comparative army officer ranks of the European Union
Comparative army enlisted ranks of the European Union
Comparative air force officer ranks of the European Union
Comparative air force enlisted ranks of the European Union
Ranks and insignia of NATO navies enlisted
Comparative navy enlisted ranks of Europe

Military comparisons